Gregory Scott Berns is an American neuroeconomist, neuroscientist, professor of psychiatry, psychologist and writer. He lives with his family in Atlanta, Georgia, US.

Berns holds the Distinguished Chair of Neuroeconomics in the Department of Psychiatry and Behavioral Sciences, Emory University School of Medicine in Atlanta where he is a professor of both psychiatry and economics. He is Director of the Center for Neuropolicy; the author of the books Satisfaction: The Science of Finding True Fulfillment, Iconoclast: A Neuroscientist Reveals How to Think Differently, How Dogs Love Us: A Neuroscientist and His Adopted Dog Decode the Canine Brain, and has made numerous media appearances.

Life and career
Gregory Berns is a distinguished neuroeconomist, holding a  university professorship in both psychiatry and economics.

Berns holds the Distinguished Chair of Neuroeconomics in the Department of Psychiatry and Behavioral Sciences, Emory University School of Medicine, Atlanta, Georgia, USA where he is a professor of both psychiatry and economics. He is Director of the Center for Neuropolicy, and has made numerous media appearances.

Berns has written numerous academic papers and two books. He has appeared on the ABC News Primetime television series; CNN and PBS and in newspapers including the New York Times and Wall Street Journal.

Education
Berns graduated with an A.B. in physics from Princeton University in 1986 after completing a senior thesis titled "The measurement of force distributions in the foot during running." In 1990 he went on to study for a Ph.D. in Biomechanical engineering, and then for an M.D. Medicine in 1994, both at the University of California.

After graduating, Berns was a Research Assistant / Postdoctoral Fellow at Salk Institute for Biological Studies from 1990 to 1994; had a General Psychiatry and Medicine Internship at University of Pittsburgh Medical Center's Western Psychiatric Institute and Clinic from 1994 to 1995, followed by an Adult Psychiatry Residency there from 1995 to 1998.

Authorship
To date, Berns has written three books. In his first book Satisfaction: the science of finding true fulfillment, published in 2005, Berns challenges the theory that people are driven to pursue pleasure and avoid pain (see pleasure principle, for example). He argues instead that true satisfaction comes from novel experiences which are undergone in the process of achieving an aim, rather than the achievement itself, and this involves an active striving rather than a "passive feeling of happiness."

Berns' second book Iconoclast: A Neuroscientist Reveals How to Think Differently continues the theme developed in Satisfaction and the exploration of the neurological bases of human creativity. It describes and investigates iconoclasts: innovative and creative people who break with the established, traditional way of thinking or of doing things; 'break' cultural icons, and manage to do what others say cannot be done. The work profiles a number of famous 'free-thinkers' such as Warren Buffett; Dale Chihuly; the Dixie Chicks; Richard Feynman; Henry Ford; Steve Jobs; Martin Luther King Jr. and Picasso.

Berns argues that iconoclasts manage to break through three major 'mental roadblocks' which he enumerates as (a) perception (often having insights triggered through visual imagery); (b) the human fear response (fear of failure, of the unknown, and of ridicule), and (c) social skills, social intelligence and social networking abilities. Berns' work is mainly interested in successful iconoclasts, not with those who show such innovation in their 'log cabin in the woods' but do not go on to market the idea.

His third book, How Dogs Love Us: A Neuroscientist and His Adopted Dog Decode the Canine Brain, was published in October 2013. The book describes Berns' efforts to train dogs to voluntarily undergo functional magnetic resonance imaging (fMRI). Because MRI machines are loud and require subjects to remain still during scans, prior to Berns' work, all brain imaging conducted on living dogs was performed with the animals under sedation. The book details the techniques that Berns and his team developed to train and test two dogs, including Berns' feist Callie, to undergo the imaging procedure. It also describes a study that the team conducted using this method, which observed increases in caudate activity in response to hand signals associated with food rewards. A later study replicated the procedure and results in a larger sample of dogs, and further supported the reliability of the technique.

Research
According to Berns' academic home page, his work in the field of neuroeconomics involves the study of "the relationship of neural systems to decision-making by using a combination of computational and functional imaging techniques" and particularly "the role of the basal ganglia in processing novelty and reward and how this region guides decision-making" and in "risky decision-making."

Reception

Books

Satisfaction

Berns' book Satisfaction was reviewed by Jonathan Beard in the December 2005 edition of the Scientific American Mind magazine.

Writing in CNN Money's Fortune magazine, John Simons sums up the main thrust of Satisfaction by quoting Berns: "The sense of satisfaction after you've successfully handled unexpected tasks or sought out unfamiliar, physically and emotionally demanding activities is your brain's signal that you're doing what nature designed you to do." Though the reviewer found that Berns can be "somewhat professorial, Satisfaction is no plodding textbook". He noted that "nothing escapes the author's investigative eye" and concluded that "Berns's gumshoe approach to scientific theory offers its own proof that a fresh take on the familiar can be most gratifying".

Iconoclast

Writing in the Winter 2009 edition of Stanford Social Innovation Review and reviewing Iconoclast, Robert J. Sternberg points to the three major mental roadblocks that people need to overcome if they wish to be iconoclasts. "First, see things differently from other people—see what others do not see. Second, conquer your fear of failure, of the unknown, and of ridicule. Third, be socially intelligent: Figure out how to interest people in your ideas and how to sell those ideas to opinion leaders." Sternburg also points out that iconoclasts' brains are wired differently. For example, the amygdala, situated within the medial temporal lobes of the brain, of the iconoclast tends to reduce their emotional reactions and fear response.

Sternberg is of the opinion that Berns gives insufficient credit to the role played by intelligence; analytical thinking; and several aspects of creative thinking, particularly conformity arising from family and cultural background. Sternberg also feels that the author gives undue emphasis to the faculty of sight in the innovative iconoclastic process. The reviewer objects to Berns' contention that "imagination comes from the visual system", pointing out that blind people can be creative (e.g. the author and political activist Helen Keller) and that other senses may be used creatively (e.g. the composer Mozart).

Overall, however, Sternberg concludes that Iconoclast is "a technically sound and inspiring book". The reviewer writes that Iconoclast "not only analyzes the nature of iconoclasm in fascinating detail, but also serves as a guide for people who feel trapped by conventional thinking and want to escape. The keys out of their prisons are in this book. It is up to these readers to use them to escape and open new doors."

Iconoclast was reviewed by Alden M. Hayashi in an article entitled Why Picasso Outearned van Gogh in MIT Sloan Management Review.

Iconoclast featured in a CBC item by Richard Handler entitled Learning how to see the world differently.

Danielle Graham also interviewed Berns about Iconoclast for SuperConsciousness Magazine.

Academic honours and awards
Berns has won numerous academic awards during his career:

 Princeton University Department of Physics: Allen G. Shenstone Prize for Outstanding Work in Experimental Physics, 1986
 University of California, Davis: University of California Regents' Fellowship, 1989–90
 American Society of Biomechanics: Postdoctoral Young Scientist Award, 1991
 Western Psychiatric Institute and Clinic, Pittsburgh, PA: Thomas Detre Prize for Outstanding Medical Student Paper in General Psychiatry, 1993
 American Psychiatric Association: APA/Lilly Resident Research Award, 1995–96
 National Institute of Mental Health: NIMH Outstanding Resident Award, 1996
 Society of Biological Psychiatry: SOBP/Lilly Fellowship Award, 1997
 Organon: Excellence in Psychiatry Residency Award, 1998
 Anxiety Disorders Association of America: Senior Travel Award, 1999
 American Psychiatric Association: APA/SmithKline Beecham Young Faculty Award, 1999
 Emory University School of Medicine: Dean's Clinical Investigator Award, 2001–2004
 World Economic Forum: Forum Fellow, 2004, 2009

Works published

Books

What It's Like to Be a Dog: And Other Adventures in Animal Neuroscience
year = 2017

Research articles
Berns' and the work of his colleagues has been featured in many academic and specialist journals:

 
 
 
 
 
 
 
 
 
 
 
 
 
 
 
 
 
 
 Pagnoni G, Zink CF, Montague PR, Berns GS: Activity in human ventral striatum locked to errors of reward prediction. Nat. Neurosci., 5:97-98, 2002. PDF.
 Dhamala M, Pagnoni G, Wiesenfeld K, Berns GS: Measurements of brain activity complexity for varying mental loads. Phys. Rev. E., 65:041917(7), 2002.
 Rilling JK, Gutman DA, Zeh TR, Pagnoni G, Berns GS, Kilts CD: A neural basis for social cooperation. Neuron, 35:395-405, 2002. PDF.
 
 McClure SM, Berns GS, Montague PR: Temporal prediction errors in a passive learning task activate human striatum. Neuron 38: 339–346, 2003. PDF.
 
 Zink CF, Pagnoni G, Martin ME, Dhamala M, Berns GS: Human striatal response to salient non-rewarding stimuli. J. Neurosci. 23:8092-8097, 2003. PDF. Accompanying editorial.
 Zink CF, Pagnoni G, Martin-Skurski ME, Chappelow JC, Berns GS: Human striatal response to monetary reward depends on saliency. Neuron 42:509-517, 2004. PDF.
 Capuron L, Pagnoni G, Demetrashvili M, Woolwine BJ, Nemeroff CB, Berns GS, Miller AH: Anterior cingulate activation and error processing during interferon-alpha treatment. Biol. Psychiatry 58:190-196, 2005. PDF.
 Berns GS, Chappelow JC, Zink CF, Pagnoni G, Martin-Skurski ME, Richards R: Neurobiological correlates of social conformity and independence during mental rotation. Biol. Psychiatry 58:245-253, 2005. PDF.
 Zink CF, Pagnoni G, Chappelow JC, Martin-Skurski ME, Berns GS: Human striatal activation reflects degree of stimulus saliency. Neuroimage 29:977-983, 2006. PDF.
 Berns GS, Chappelow J, Cekic M, Zink CF, Pagnoni G, Martin-Skurski ME: Neurobiologic substrates of dread. Science, 312:754-758, 2006. PDF. Supporting Materials.
 Capuron L, Pagnoni G, Demetrashvili MF, Lawson DH, Fornwalt FB, Woolwine B, Berns GS, Nemeroff CB, Miller AH: Basal ganglia hypermetabolism and symptoms of fatigue during interferon-alpha therapy. Neuropsychopharmacology 32:2394-2392, 2007.
 Berns GS, Capra CM, Moore S, Noussair C: A shocking experiment: new evidence on probability weighting and common ratio violations. Judgment & Decision Making 2:234-242, 2007. PDF.
 Chandrasekhar PVS, Capra CM, Moore S, Noussair C, Berns GS: Neurobiological regret and rejoice functions for aversive outcomes. Neuroimage 39:1472-1484 (epub Nov 2007). PDF.
 Berns GS, Capra CM, Chappelow J, Moore S, Noussair C: Nonlinear neurobiological probability weighting functions for aversive outcomes. Neuroimage 39:2047-2057, 2008 (epub Nov 2007). PDF.

Lectures

Interviews, appearances and media coverage

See also
Behavioural sciences
Motivation
Pleasure
Pleasure principle
Hyperscanning

References

External links
Computation and Cognitive Neuroscience Lab at Emory University
Neuropolicy Center at Emory University
Berns' home page at Emory University
Berns' blog at Psychology Today
Sit, Stay, Scan: How do dogs think? An interview with Gregory Berns Human Animal Science

Living people
American neuroscientists
American psychiatrists
21st-century American psychologists
Princeton University alumni
University of California, Davis alumni
University of California, San Diego alumni
Emory University faculty
Place of birth missing (living people)
1964 births
20th-century American psychologists